Leon Šušnja (born 5 August 1993) is a Croatian handball player for Wisła Płock and the Croatian national team.

References

1993 births
Living people
People from Široki Brijeg
Croatian male handball players
Expatriate handball players in Poland
Croatian expatriate sportspeople in Poland
RK Zagreb players
Wisła Płock (handball) players
Competitors at the 2018 Mediterranean Games
Mediterranean Games gold medalists for Croatia
Mediterranean Games medalists in handball